Mario Rebecchi (born 31 August 1983, in Voghera) is an Italian football midfielder. He currently plays for Lecco.

Career
Rebecchi started his career at Internazionale. He made his first team debut against A.S. Bari of a Coppa Italia match, on 4 December 2002.

In January 2004, he was loaned out to Genoa C.F.C. of Serie B.

On July 12, 2004, he was loaned to Parma, but returned to Inter on August 31, which was the last day of transfer window.

He left for Cremonese in January 2005. Cremonese was later crowned the champion of Serie C1A.

In the summer of 2005, Rebecchi was sold to Serie C1 side Lumezzane in joint-ownership bid, for €85,000, and Lumezzane got full ownership two years later, for free.

After a successful stint with Andria, he was signed in 2009 by Valle del Giovenco.

References

External links
Inter Archive
 Profile at Lumezzane

1983 births
Living people
People from Voghera
Italian footballers
Serie B players
Inter Milan players
Genoa C.F.C. players
U.S. Cremonese players
S.S. Fidelis Andria 1928 players
Calcio Lecco 1912 players
Association football midfielders
Footballers from Lombardy
Sportspeople from the Province of Pavia